Alberto Remigio Cárdenas y Pardo (born January 3, 1948) is a Cuban-born American lawyer, politician and conservative activist who is a partner in the law firm of Squire Patton Boggs and in the Advocacy Group at Cardenas Partners. He has been named as one of Washington D.C.'s top lobbyists by The Hill newspaper. Cardenas was a member of the Board of Trustees of Florida A&M University.

Life and career
Cárdenas was born in Havana, Cuba. He graduated from St. Thomas Aquinas High School in Fort Lauderdale, Florida, and received his associate's degree from Miami Dade Community College, a bachelor's degree from Florida Atlantic University, and his Juris Doctor from Seton Hall University.
He is an alumnus of Florida Atlantic University's Eta Mu chapter of the Alpha Tau Omega fraternity.

Cardenas has been active in the Republican Party throughout his career. He was responsible for the transition of the United States Department of Commerce at the beginning of the Ronald Reagan administration, and was appointed the first U.S. ambassador to St. Kitts and Nevis in 1983. He served on the board of the Federal National Mortgage Association from 1985 to 1990, as an appointee of Reagan and George H. W. Bush.

Cardenas served three terms as Vice-Chairman and two terms as Chairman of the Republican Party of Florida. He was also appointed to the Executive Committee of the Republican Party, the highest policy-making board at the Republican National Committee. He was the first Hispanic to lead a major state party and remains the only Hispanic Republican Party Chairman in Florida history. He represented Florida as a delegate at every Republican National Convention held from 1976 to 2008.

During CPAC 2011, Cardenas transitioned into the chairmanship of the American Conservative Union, with then-chairman David Keene's retirement. On June 1, 2014, Cardenas resigned as American Conservative Union Chairman.  He was succeeded by Matt Schlapp.

Cardenas was a senior adviser and fundraiser for the 2016 Jeb Bush presidential campaign until it was suspended.

Personal life

On March 2, 2019, Cardenas married CNN contributor Ana Navarro.

References

External links
 

1948 births
Living people
American lobbyists
American politicians of Cuban descent
Cardenas, Alberto "Al"
Florida Atlantic University alumni
Florida lawyers
Florida Republicans
Miami Dade College alumni
Seton Hall University School of Law alumni
State political party chairs of Florida
People associated with Squire Patton Boggs